Carruanthus is a genus of flowering plants from the ice plant family Aizoaceae.

Carruanthus ringens and Carruanthus peersi are species native to South Africa.

Species
 Carruanthus peersii
 Carruanthus ringens

References

 
Aizoaceae genera